Events in the year 2004 in Germany.

Incumbents
President – Johannes Rau (until 30 July), Horst Köhler (starting 30 July)
Chancellor – Gerhard Schröder

Events

January

February
 5–15 February - 54th Berlin International Film Festival

March
 19 March: Germany in the Eurovision Song Contest 2004

April

May

June
 9 June: 2004 Cologne bombing

July

August
 2 August: Protests against Hartz IV reforms
 21 August: The Berlin Rules on Water Resources are adopted by the International Law Association.

September

October

November

December
 26 December: Several thousands of Germans are among thousands of people killed by the 2004 Indian Ocean tsunami.

Elections

 2004 German presidential election
 2004 European Parliament election in Germany
 2004 Brandenburg state election
 2004 Hamburg state election
 2004 Saarland state election
 2004 Saxony state election
 2004 Thuringian state election

Sport

 2003–04 Bundesliga
 2003–04 2. Bundesliga
 2003–04 Deutsche Eishockey Liga season
 2004 BMW Open
 2004 German Grand Prix
 2004 European Grand Prix
 2004 German motorcycle Grand Prix

Births
15 November — Vincent Keymer, German chess prodigy
20 November — Youssoufa Moukoko, German professional footballer.

Deaths

6 February - Claus Hinrich Casdorff, German journalist and writer (born 1925)
19 May - Carl Raddatz, German actor (born 1912)
24 May - Friedrich Wilhelm Christians, German banker (born 1922)
16 June - Ursula Lillig, German actress (born 1938)
8 July - Albert Friedlander, German rabbi and teacher (born 1927)
10 July - Inge Meysel, German actress (born 1910)
22 July - Bodo Hauser, German journalist and writer (born 1946)
11 August -Wolfgang Mommsen, German historian (born 1930)
19 August - Günter Rexrodt, German politician (born 1941)
4 October - Helmut Bantz, German gymnast (born 1921)
17 October - Andreas Sassen, football player (born 1968)
28 September - Christl Cranz, German alpine racer (born 1914)
1 December - Prince Bernhard of Lippe-Biesterfeld, German-born prince who was the consort of Queen Juliana of the Netherlands (born 1911)
12 December - Herbert Dreilich, German rock musician (born 1942)

See also
2004 in German television

References

 
Years of the 21st century in Germany
2000s in Germany
Germany
Germany